Mark Johnston-Allen (born 28 December 1968 in Bristol) is a former professional snooker player.

Career
He reached the final of the 1991 European Open while ranked #59 in the world, a run which included a 5–0 win over Stephen Hendry; Johnston-Allen lost 9–7 to Tony Jones in the final. He reached the final of the same event again a year later, this time losing 9–3 to Jimmy White. He qualified for the World Championship in 1992, and lost 10–4 to Tony Knowles in the first round.

At the International Open in 1995, he knocked out Hendry, Mark Williams and Ronnie O'Sullivan before losing 5–0 to White in the quarter-finals. A month later he beat White en route to the semi-finals of the Thailand Open, where he lost to James Wattana. His world ranking peaked at #31 in the 1992/1993 season, but he had dropped out of the world's top 64 by 1997/98. He also holds the distinction of having won each of his three matches against Stephen Hendry.

He now works as a commentator for World Snooker LiveTV which is broadcast on the internet, and also as an MC at snooker events.

Career finals

Ranking finals: 2

Pro-am finals: 2

References

Living people
English snooker players
Snooker writers and broadcasters
1968 births
Sportspeople from Bristol